Dubravka Jurlina Alibegović (born 5 November 1963) is a Croatian economist and politician. As an independent in the Cabinet of Tihomir Orešković, she served as the Minister of Public Administration from January to October 2016.

Born in Zagreb, Alibegović is a graduate of the Faculty of Economics and Business, University of Zagreb. She was the director of the Institute of Economics, Zagreb from 2013 to 2016.

References

External links

Dubravka Jurlina Alibegović profile 

1963 births
Living people
21st-century Croatian women politicians
21st-century Croatian politicians
20th-century Croatian economists
Faculty of Economics and Business, University of Zagreb alumni
Independent politicians in Croatia
Politicians from Zagreb
21st-century Croatian economists